James Corker or James Cleveland (born 1753 or 1754, died March 24, 1791) was a man of English descent who took part in clan fighting in precolonial Sierra Leone.

Background
James Cleveland was the son of English slaver, William Cleveland and his Kissi mistress. Cleveland had two half siblings, John and Elizabeth who were the children of William and his royal Sherbro wife, Kate Corker, a daughter of Chief Skinner Corker (son of the original Englishman Thomas Corker).

1750s births
Year of birth uncertain
1791 deaths
Sherbro people